Marc Saint-Saëns (1903–1979) was a French printmaker.

 Le Bouquet  (1951) by Marc Saint-Saëns is among the best and most representative French tapestries of the fifties. It is a tribute to Marc Saint-Saëns's predilection for scenes from nature and rustic life.

References

1903 births
1979 deaths
French printmakers
Artists from Toulouse